Afaf El-Hodhod (born October 1, 1996, in Cairo) is an Egyptian sport shooter. She won a total of three medals, including two golds, in both air and sport pistol at the African Shooting Championships (2014 and 2015), and also attained a top five finish at the 2014 Summer Youth Olympics.

El-Hodhod made her first Olympic team for Egypt as a seventeen-year-old at the 2014 Summer Youth Olympics in Nanjing, China, where she competed in the girls' 10 m air pistol. Coming to the final with a third seed at 380 points, El-Hodhod commanded an early lead after thirteen shots, but then spoiled her previous good results with a 7.7 that saw her stumble down the medal position to fifth at 137.4.

When Cairo hosted the 2015 African Championships on her senior debut, El-Hodhod managed to break an African record of 381 out of a possible 400 approaching to the final, and then beat Tunisia's 2012 Olympian Noura Nasri in a duel to defend her air pistol title with a score of 198.2; the first being previously done as a junior in 2014.

References

External links
 
 

1996 births
Living people
Egyptian female sport shooters
Shooters at the 2014 Summer Youth Olympics
Sportspeople from Cairo
Olympic shooters of Egypt
Shooters at the 2016 Summer Olympics
Mediterranean Games bronze medalists for Egypt
Mediterranean Games medalists in shooting
Competitors at the 2018 Mediterranean Games
20th-century Egyptian women
21st-century Egyptian women